Derek Brunson (born January 4, 1984) is an American professional mixed martial artist. He currently competes in the Middleweight division for the Ultimate Fighting Championship (UFC). As of March 7, 2023, he is #8 in the UFC middleweight rankings.

Background
Brunson was a competitive cheerleader and also wrestled at John T. Hoggard High School in Wilmington, North Carolina, under coach Dan Willis. Brunson had scholarships for both cheerleading and wrestling, but chose to wrestle in college. He was a three-time NCAA Division II All-American wrestler for the University of North Carolina at Pembroke. When he finished college, he immediately turned his attention to mixed martial arts.
Derek was inspired by his high school classmates Shelly Johnson to pursue a career in fighting.

Mixed martial arts career
Brunson made his professional MMA debut in May 2010 against John Bryant where he won by a rear-naked choke in under a minute. He then won his next five fights with none of them making it past 2:30 of the first round.

Strikeforce
Brunson made his Strikeforce debut on June 24, 2011, at Strikeforce Challengers: Fedor vs. Terry against undefeated Jeremy Hamilton. He won the fight via unanimous decision.

In a quick turnaround, Brunson fought his second fight for Strikeforce just over one month after his debut. He faced Lumumba Sayers on the undercard of Strikeforce: Fedor vs. Henderson on July 30, 2011. He won the fight via submission in the first round.

Brunson's next fight was on November 18, 2011, at Strikeforce Challengers: Britt vs. Sayers against Nate James. He won the fight via unanimous decision.

He was scheduled to face Ronaldo Souza on March 3, 2012, at Strikeforce: Tate vs. Rousey. However, the Ohio State Athletic Commission denied his fight license based on an eye exam he had submitted. Brunson fought wearing contacts in all of his bouts, but Ohio has a rule against this. He immediately scheduled a Lasik procedure and missed about six weeks. He later faced Souza on August 18, 2012, at Strikeforce: Rousey vs. Kaufman and was defeated by KO at :41 of the 1st round.

The Ultimate Fighter
Brunson was accepted to compete in The Ultimate Fighter 17, but on the first day of filming he was pulled from the competition due to Showtime having yet to release him from his contract.

Ultimate Fighting Championship
Brunson made his UFC debut replacing an injured Karlos Vemola against Chris Leben on December 29, 2012, at UFC 155. Despite being a late replacement and heavy underdog, Brunson utilized his superior wrestling to defeat Leben via unanimous decision.

He was expected to face Ronny Markes on June 8, 2013, at UFC on Fuel TV 10. However, the bout was scrapped on the day of the weigh in as Markes was involved in a traffic accident. While Markes was not seriously injured, the incident prevented him from competing.

Brunson was expected to face Yoel Romero on August 31, 2013, at UFC 164 but was eventually forced off the card with an injury.

He was expected to face Antonio Braga Neto on November 6, 2013, at UFC Fight Night 31. However, Neto pulled out of the bout citing an injury and was replaced by Brian Houston. Brunson won the fight in impressive fashion early, connecting with a head kick on Houston and then securing a rear-naked choke submission.

The bout with Romero was rescheduled for January 15, 2014, at UFC Fight Night 35. After winning the first two rounds, Brunson was dropped by a left hook and lost the fight via TKO due to elbows on the ground in the third round. Both fighters earned a $50,000 Fight of the Night bonus award.

On February 15, 2014, it was announced that Brunson had signed a four-fight contract with UFC.

Brunson was expected to face Lorenz Larkin on August 2, 2014, at UFC 176. After UFC 176 was cancelled, Larkin/Brunson was rescheduled and eventually took place on August 30, 2014, at UFC 177. Brunson won the fight via unanimous decision.

Brunson was expected to face Ed Herman on December 13, 2014, at UFC on Fox 13. However, the bout was scrapped just hours before the fight, as Brunson was stricken with a stomach ailment. Subsequently, the bout with Herman was rescheduled and took place on January 31, 2015, at UFC 183. Brunson won the fight via TKO in the first round.

Brunson was expected to face Krzysztof Jotko on June 20, 2015, at UFC Fight Night 69. However, Brunson pulled out of the fight on June 9 citing a rib injury and was briefly replaced by Uriah Hall. Three days after the booking, Hall was removed due to an alleged visa issue. In turn, Jotko was removed from the card entirely.

Brunson faced Sam Alvey on August 8, 2015, at UFC Fight Night 73. He won the fight via TKO in the first round.

Brunson next faced Roan Carneiro on February 21, 2016, at UFC Fight Night 83. He won the fight via TKO, earning his third consecutive TKO stoppage in the first round.

He was scheduled to face Gegard Mousasi on July 9, 2016, at UFC 200. However, he later was forced to pull out of the bout.

Brunson faced Uriah Hall on September 17, 2016, at UFC Fight Night 94. Brunson won the fight via TKO in the first round after dropping Hall with a left hook and finishing him with a flurry of ground and pound.

Brunson faced Robert Whittaker on November 27, 2016, at UFC Fight Night 101. He lost the back and forth fight via first-round TKO. Both participants were awarded a Fight of the Night bonus.

Brunson faced Anderson Silva on February 11, 2017, at UFC 208. He lost the fight via unanimous decision.

Brunson fought Dan Kelly on June 11, 2017, at UFC Fight Night 110. He won by knockout in the first round after dropping Kelly with a straight left and finishing him off with a barrage of ground and pound.

Brunson faced Lyoto Machida on October 28, 2017, at UFC Fight Night 119. He won the fight via knockout in the first round. This win also earned him a Performance of the Night bonus award.

A rematch with Ronaldo Souza took place on January 27, 2018, in the main event at UFC on Fox 27. Brunson lost the fight via TKO in the first round.

He was expected to face Antônio Carlos Júnior on August 4, 2018, at UFC 227. However, Brunson pulled out of the fight in early July citing an eye injury.

Brunson faced Israel Adesanya on November 3, 2018, at UFC 230. He lost the fight via technical knockout in round one.

Brunson faced Elias Theodorou on May 4, 2019, at UFC Fight Night 151. He won the fight by unanimous decision.

He faced Ian Heinisch on August 17, 2019, at UFC 241. He won the fight by unanimous decision.

In December 2019, Brunson announced on his social media that he had signed a new, six-fight contract with the UFC.

Brunson was expected to face Edmen Shahbazyan on March 7, 2020, at UFC 248. However it was announced on February 20 that the bout had been rescheduled and would take place on April 11, 2020, at UFC Fight Night: Overeem vs. Harris. Due to the COVID-19 pandemic, the event was eventually postponed. The bout eventually was scheduled on August 1, 2020, at UFC Fight Night: Brunson vs. Shahbazyan. He won the fight via technical knockout in round three.

Brunson faced Kevin Holland on March 20, 2021, at UFC on ESPN 21. He won the fight via unanimous decision.

Brunson faced Darren Till on September 4, 2021, at UFC Fight Night: Brunson vs. Till. He won the fight via rear-naked choke submission in round three.

Brunson was scheduled to face Jared Cannonier on January 22, 2022, at UFC 270. However, for undisclosed reasons the bout was moved to UFC 271 on February 12, 2022. He lost the fight via knockout in round two. Brunson stated that his next fight will be his final fight in mixed martial arts.

Brunson was scheduled to face Jack Hermansson on December 3, 2022, at UFC on ESPN 42. However, Brunson withdrew due to an undisclosed injury and was replaced by Roman Dolidze.

Brunson faced Dricus du Plessis on March 4, 2023, at UFC 285. He lost the fight via technical knockout due to a corner stoppage at 4:59 of the second round.

Championships and accomplishments

Mixed martial arts
Ultimate Fighting Championship
Fight of the Night (Two times)
Performance of the Night (One time)
 Second most wins in UFC middleweight history (14) (Tied with Anderson Silva and Brad Tavares)
 Tied (Nate Marquardt and Chris Leben) for third most finishes in UFC Middleweight division history (9)
Sherdog
2017 Robbery of the Year vs. Anderson Silva
MMAJunkie.com
2017 Robbery of the Year vs. Anderson Silva
MMADNA.nl
2017 Robbery of the Year vs. Anderson Silva

Collegiate sports
National Collegiate Athletic Association
NCAA Division II All-American out of University of North Carolina at Pembroke  (2003, 2005)
University of North Carolina at Pembroke
2002 UCA Small Co-ed National Champs - Cheerleading

Other accomplishments
Young Alumnus of the Year 2014 (UNC Pembroke)
UNC Pembroke Athletics Hall of Fame, Inducted 2016

Mixed martial arts record

|-
|
|align=center|23–9
|Dricus du Plessis
|TKO (corner stoppage)
|UFC 285
|
|align=center|2
|align=center|4:59
|Las Vegas, Nevada, United States
|-
|Loss
|align=center|23–8
|Jared Cannonier
|KO (elbows)
|UFC 271
|
|align=center|2
|align=center|4:29
|Houston, Texas, United States
|
|-
|Win
|align=center|23–7
|Darren Till
|Submission (rear-naked choke)
|UFC Fight Night: Brunson vs. Till 
|
|align=center|3
|align=center|2:13
|Las Vegas, Nevada, United States
|
|-
|Win
|align=center|22–7
|Kevin Holland
|Decision (unanimous)
|UFC on ESPN: Brunson vs. Holland
|
|align=center|5
|align=center|5:00
|Las Vegas, Nevada, United States
|
|-
|Win
|align=center|21–7
|Edmen Shahbazyan
|TKO (punches)
|UFC Fight Night: Brunson vs. Shahbazyan 
|
|align=center|3
|align=center|0:26
|Las Vegas, Nevada, United States
|
|-
|Win
|align=center|20–7
|Ian Heinisch
|Decision (unanimous)
|UFC 241 
|
|align=center|3
|align=center|5:00
|Anaheim, California, United States
|
|-
|Win
|align=center|19–7
|Elias Theodorou
|Decision (unanimous)
|UFC Fight Night: Iaquinta vs. Cowboy 
|
|align=center|3
|align=center|5:00
|Ottawa, Ontario, Canada
|  
|-
|Loss
|align=center|18–7
|Israel Adesanya
|TKO (knees and punches)
|UFC 230
|
|align=center|1
|align=center|4:51
|New York City, New York, United States
|
|-
|Loss
|align=center|18–6
|Ronaldo Souza
|KO (head kick and punches) 
|UFC on Fox: Jacaré vs. Brunson 2
|
|align=center|1
|align=center|3:50
|Charlotte, North Carolina, United States
|
|-
|Win
|align=center|18–5
|Lyoto Machida
|KO (punches)
|UFC Fight Night: Brunson vs. Machida
|
|align=center|1
|align=center|2:30
|São Paulo, Brazil
|
|-
|Win
|align=center|17–5
|Dan Kelly
|KO (punch)
|UFC Fight Night: Lewis vs. Hunt
|
|align=center|1
|align=center|1:16
|Auckland, New Zealand
|
|-
|Loss
|align=center|16–5
|Anderson Silva
|Decision (unanimous)
|UFC 208
|
|align=center|3
|align=center|5:00
|Brooklyn, New York, United States
| 
|-
| Loss
| align=center|16–4
| Robert Whittaker
| TKO (head kick and punches)
| UFC Fight Night: Whittaker vs. Brunson
| 
| align=center| 1
| align=center| 4:07
| Melbourne, Australia
| 
|-
| Win
| align=center|16–3
| Uriah Hall
| TKO (punch)
| UFC Fight Night: Poirier vs. Johnson
| 
| align=center|1
| align=center|1:41
| Hidalgo, Texas, United States
|
|-
| Win
| align=center|15–3
| Roan Carneiro
| KO (punches)
| UFC Fight Night: Cowboy vs. Cowboy
| 
| align=center|1
| align=center|2:38
| Pittsburgh, Pennsylvania, United States
|
|-
| Win
| align=center| 14–3
| Sam Alvey
| TKO (punches)
| UFC Fight Night: Teixeira vs. Saint Preux
| 
| align=center| 1
| align=center| 2:19
| Nashville, Tennessee, United States
| 
|-
| Win
| align="center" | 13–3
| Ed Herman
| TKO (punches)
| UFC 183
| 
| align=center| 1
| align=center| 0:36
| Las Vegas, Nevada, United States
| 
|-
| Win
| align="center" | 12–3
| Lorenz Larkin
| Decision (unanimous)
| UFC 177
| 
| align=center| 3
| align=center| 5:00
| Sacramento, California, United States
| 
|-
| Loss
| align="center" | 11–3
| Yoel Romero
| TKO (punches and elbows)
| UFC Fight Night: Rockhold vs. Philippou
| 
| align=center| 3
| align=center| 3:23
| Duluth, Georgia, United States
| 
|-
| Win
| align="center" | 11–2
| Brian Houston
| Submission (rear-naked choke)
| UFC: Fight for the Troops 3
| 
| align=center| 1
| align=center| 0:48
| Fort Campbell, Kentucky, United States
| 
|-
| Win
| align="center" | 10–2
| Chris Leben
| Decision (unanimous)
| UFC 155
| 
| align=center| 3
| align=center| 5:00
| Las Vegas, Nevada, United States
| 
|-
| Loss
| align="center" | 9–2
| Ronaldo Souza
| KO (punches)
| Strikeforce: Rousey vs. Kaufman
| 
| align=center| 1
| align=center| 0:41
| San Diego, California, United States
| 
|-
| Loss
| align=center| 9–1
| Kendall Grove
| Decision (split)
| ShoFight 20
| 
| align=center| 3
| align=center| 5:00
| Springfield, Missouri, United States
| 
|-
| Win
| align=center| 9–0
| Nate James
| Decision (unanimous)
| Strikeforce Challengers: Britt vs. Sayers
| 
| align=center| 3
| align=center| 5:00
| Las Vegas, Nevada, United States
| 
|-
| Win
| align=center| 8–0
| Lumumba Sayers
| Submission (rear-naked choke)
| Strikeforce: Fedor vs. Henderson
| 
| align=center| 1
| align=center| 4:33
| Hoffman Estates, Illinois, United States
| 
|-
| Win
| align=center| 7–0
| Jeremy Hamilton
| Decision (unanimous)
| Strikeforce Challengers: Fodor vs. Terry
| 
| align=center| 3
| align=center| 5:00
| Kent, Washington, United States
| 
|-
| Win
| align=center| 6–0
| Danny Babcock
| KO (punch)
| World Extreme Fighting 45
| 
| align=center| 1
| align=center| 1:07
| Jacksonville, Florida, United States
| 
|-
| Win
| align=center| 5–0
| Rhomez Brower
| TKO (submission to punches)
| XFP: The Holiday Fight Fest
| 
| align=center| 1
| align=center| 2:27
| Wilmington, North Carolina, United States
| 
|-
| Win
| align=center| 4–0
| Todd Chattelle
| TKO (punches)
| ICE: Fright Night 2010
| 
| align=center| 1
| align=center| 0:14
| Providence, Rhode Island, United States
| 
|-
| Win
| align=center| 3–0
| Edward Jackson
| KO (punches)
| Carolina's Summer Fight Series 3
| 
| align=center| 1
| align=center| 0:41
| Jacksonville, North Carolina, United States
| 
|-
| Win
| align=center| 2–0
| Chris McNally
| KO (punches)
| Carolina's Summer Fight Series 2
| 
| align=center| 1
| align=center| 1:42
| Wilmington, North Carolina, United States
| 
|-
| Win
| align=center| 1–0
| John Bryant
| Submission (rear-naked choke)
| Carolina's Summer Fight Series 1
| 
| align=center| 1
| align=center| 0:52
| Wilmington, North Carolina, United States
|

NCAA record

! colspan="8"| NCAA Division II Championships Matches
|-
!  Res.
!  Record
!  Opponent
!  Score
!  Date
!  Event
|-
! style=background:white colspan=6 |2005 NCAA (DII) Championships 7th at 184 lbs
|-
|Loss
|6-7
|align=left| Don Ortega 
|style="font-size:88%"|3-5
|style="font-size:88%" rowspan=5|March 11–12, 2005
|style="font-size:88%" rowspan=5|2005 NCAA Division II Wrestling Championships
|-
|Loss
|6-6
|align=left|Kristopher Klepacz
|style="font-size:88%"|Fall
|-
|Win
|6-5
|align=left|Dillon Blackman
|style="font-size:88%"|Fall
|-
|Loss
|5-5
|align=left|Clint Carmony
|style="font-size:88%"|5-8
|-
|Win
|5-4
|align=left|Todd Naasz
|style="font-size:88%"|12-5
|-
! style=background:white colspan=6 |2004 NCAA (DII) Championships at 184 lbs
|-
|Loss
|4-4
|align=left|Corey Jacoby
|style="font-size:88%"|TB-1 1-2
|style="font-size:88%" rowspan=3|March 12–13, 2004
|style="font-size:88%" rowspan=3|2004 NCAA Division II Wrestling Championships
|-
|Win
|4-3
|align=left|Matt Trout
|style="font-size:88%"|MD 16-6
|-
|Loss
|3-3
|align=left|Greg Nurrenbern
|style="font-size:88%"|4-10
|-
! style=background:white colspan=6 |2003 NCAA (DII) Championships 4th at 184 lbs
|-
|Loss
|3-2
|align=left|Jeff Henning
|style="font-size:88%"|TF 2-18
|style="font-size:88%" rowspan=5|March 14–15, 2003
|style="font-size:88%" rowspan=5|2003 NCAA Division II Wrestling Championships
|-
|Win
|3-1
|align=left|Ben McAvinew
|style="font-size:88%"|10-5
|-
|Loss
|2-1
|align=left|Mauricio Wright
|style="font-size:88%"|5-11
|-
|Win
|2-0
|align=left|Sam Kenton
|style="font-size:88%"|5-3
|-
|Win
|1-0
|align=left|Ben Holscher
|style="font-size:88%"|11-5
|-

See also
List of current UFC fighters
List of male mixed martial artists

References

External links

1984 births
Living people
American male mixed martial artists
African-American mixed martial artists
Mixed martial artists from North Carolina
Middleweight mixed martial artists
Mixed martial artists utilizing boxing
Mixed martial artists utilizing collegiate wrestling
Mixed martial artists utilizing Brazilian jiu-jitsu
Ultimate Fighting Championship male fighters
American male sport wrestlers
African-American sport wrestlers
Amateur wrestlers
American practitioners of Brazilian jiu-jitsu
People awarded a black belt in Brazilian jiu-jitsu
Sportspeople from Wilmington, North Carolina
21st-century African-American sportspeople
20th-century African-American people